The Roko Aero NG4 is a single-engined sport aircraft, available in both light-sport aircraft and ultralight models, which seats two side by side.  It is in production in the Czech Republic.

Design and development
Jiří Konečný designed the CZAW SportCruiser while working for the Czech Aircraft Works (CZAW). His first design after he left CZAW to set up Roko Aero, the NG4 had much in common with the SportCruiser and uses some of its components, though the airframe is different in detail.  Its commercial launch was in December 2007 and it was first shown in Prague in 2008. The two prototypes, one the ultralight NG4 UL and the other, the NG4 LSA meeting the LSA criteria, were demonstrated during 2008.  The main differences between the two are in span and weight: the UL has a shorter span (8.10 m, 26 ft 7 in) than the LSA (10.10 m, 33 ft 1.5 in).  With an empty weight of 298 kg (657 lb) the prototype UL was somewhat over its target of 280 kg (617 lb) but 32 kg (71 lb) lighter than the LSA.

The NG4 is a conventionally laid out low wing monoplane, built from riveted aluminium apart from composite wing tips and engine cowling. It has straight-tapered wings with barely swept leading edges.  The UL version has upturned tips and the LSA short chord winglets. Four position split flaps fill the trailing edges inboard of the ailerons. The port aileron has a flight adjustable trim tab.  The tail surfaces are also straight-tapered; fin and rudder are swept.  Rear control surfaces, like the ailerons are unbalanced; there is a large, centrally placed elevator trim tab.

The cabin seats two side by side under a large, single-piece, forward-hinged canopy, with supplementary transparencies behind the seats where there is baggage space.  Wing lockers provide further stowage space.  The NG4 has a tricycle undercarriage with fuselage mounted cantilever spring legs.  All wheels have spats.

The LSA prototype is powered by a 75 kW (100 hp) Rotax 912 ULS engine, but the 86 kW (115 hp) Rotax 914 ULS, 90 kW (120 hp) Jabiru 2200 and 93 kW (125 hp) Continental IO-240 are options.  The two Rotax engines are also options for the UL version, together with the lower-powered 50 kW (80 hp) Rotax 912 UL.

Operational history

By mid-2010, 12 NG4s appeared in European registers, and a total of 37 had been delivered.

Specifications (LSA)

References

2000s Czech sport aircraft
Ultralight aircraft
Light-sport aircraft
Low-wing aircraft
Single-engined tractor aircraft
Aircraft first flown in 2008